"6 AM" is a Spanish-language song performed by Colombian singer J Balvin, featuring Puerto Rican singer Farruko. Is the fourth and last single from his first studio album La Familia (2013). The song is nominated for Best Urban Performance and Best Urban Song at the 15th Latin Grammy Awards. It won the Billboard Latin Music Award for Latin Rhythm Airplay Song of the Year in 2015. , the music video has received over 1.0 billion views on YouTube.

Charts

Weekly charts

Year-end charts

Decade-end charts

Certifications

Accolades

See also
List of Billboard number-one Latin songs of 2014

References 

2013 singles
J Balvin songs
Songs written by J Balvin
Capitol Latin singles
Spanish-language songs
Farruko songs